A gremiale, sometimes anglicized as gremial, is a square or oblong cloth or apron which a Roman Catholic bishop wears over his lap during certain liturgical ceremonies, in order to protect his vestments (especially the chasuble).

The use of the gremiale is prescribed by the "Cæremoniale Episcoporum" and (historically) by the "Pontificale", which contain rubrics for the Roman Rite of the Catholic Church. It is used by the bishop on the following occasions:

 during the washing of feet in the Mass of the Lord's Supper
 during the anointments in connection with Holy orders
 during the consecration of a church or altar
 while seated on the Cathedra
 during the distribution of blessed candles, palms or ashes
 
The gremiale is ordinarily made of linen; the gremiale used during the pontifical Mass is made of silk, decorated by a cross in the centre, and trimmed with silk embroidery, in colour corresponding with the colour of the chasuble. 
 
Little is known of its history; apparently its origin dates back to the later Middle Ages. The Roman Ordo of Gaetano Stefaneschi (c. 1311) mention it first (n. 48); soon after it is mentioned in the statutes of John Grandisson of Exeter as early as 1339, In earlier times it was used not only any bishop but also by priests. It is not blessed and has no symbolical meaning.

Sources
, s.v., "Gremiale"

References

Roman Catholic vestments